Catherine O'Loughlin may refer to:

 Catherine O'Loughlin (Clare camogie player)
 Catherine O'Loughlin (Wexford camogie player)